{{Automatic taxobox
| image =
| display_parents = 4
| taxon = Triceratorhynchus
| authority = Summerh.
| synonyms_ref = 
| synonyms = 
Distylodon Summerh. 
|subdivision =
Triceratorhynchus comptus (Summerh.) Szlach., Oledrz. & MytnikTriceratorhynchus sonkeanus (Droissart, Stévart & P.J.Cribb) Szlach., Oledrz. & Mytnik
Triceratorhynchus viridiflorus Summerh.
|subdivision_ranks = Species
|type_species = Triceratorhynchus viridiflorus Summerh.
}}Triceratorhynchus is a genus of flowering plants of the orchid family, Orchidaceae. It is native to central Africa: Cameroon, Rwanda, Burundi, Uganda, and Kenya.Fischer, E., Rembold, K., Althof, A. & Obholzer, J. (2010). Annotated checklist of the vascular plants of Kakamega forest, Western province, Kenya. Journal of East African Natural History 99: 129-226.

Description
Vegetative characteristics
The species are dwarf epiphytes with short stems, which bear many leaves. The leaf shape is oblong or lanceolate.
Generative characteristics
The inflorescences produce one to many small, spurred, inconspicuous flowers.

Taxonomy
Taxonomic history
The genus was described in 1951 by the British botanist Victor Samuel Summerhayes (1897–1974). His concept of the genus only included the type species, which he described as Triceratorhynchus viridiflorus Summerh. The other two species of the genus were formerly placed in Distylodon Summerh., which is a synonym of Triceratorhynchus. Therefore, the genus now consists of three species.

Etymology
The generic name Triceratorhynchus is composed of the three Greek words tri (three), keras (horn) and rhynchos'' (beak or snout), which refer to aspects of the floral structure.

Horticulture
The species of this genus are not cultivated.

See also 
 List of Orchidaceae genera

References

External links 

African Orchids, Triceratorhynchus viridiflorus
Colnect, photo of Burundi postage stamp bearing depiction of  Triceratorhynchus viridiflorus

Vandeae genera
Angraecinae
Orchids of Africa
Flora of Burundi
Flora of Cameroon
Flora of Kenya
Flora of Rwanda
Flora of Uganda
Orchids of Cameroon
Orchids of Kenya